The Braamfontein Explosion was an explosion of a freight train carrying dynamite in Braamfontein, a suburb of Johannesburg, in 1896. It was one of the largest non-nuclear explosions in history.

Explosion

On 16 February 1896, a freight train with eight trucks of dynamite - 2300 cases of 60lb each, or about 60 tonnes - was put in a siding at Braamfontein railway station. The dynamite was destined for nearby mines, but the mine's stores of dynamite were already full so the train was left in the siding - for days, in very hot weather - until there was somewhere to store the dynamite.

On the afternoon of 19 February, after labourers had started to unload the train, a shunter came to move it to another part of the siding; but after the impact of the shunter, the dynamite exploded. Herman Eugene Schoch recorded hearing the explosion in Rustenburg, ca. 120 km away.

Suburbs as far away as Fordsburg were seriously damaged, and about 3,000 people lost their homes.

Memorials
Accounts vary, but it is thought that over 70 people were killed and more than 200 were injured. A memorial at the Braamfontein cemetery reads that 75 "whites and coloured" were killed.

In 2012, artist Eduardo Cachuco created "Explosion, 1896", a complex artwork based on the explosion which was shown at the "looking glass" exhibition.

References

External links
 Memorial
 Series of Photographs relating to the Explosion

History of Johannesburg
1896 in South Africa
1896 disasters in Africa
19th century in Johannesburg
19th-century disasters in South Africa
Explosions in 1896
Explosions in South Africa